Peter Strohm was a German crime television series, produced between 1989 and 1996.

See also
List of German television series

External links
 

Television shows set in Hamburg
German action television series
German crime television series
1989 German television series debuts
1996 German television series endings
German-language television shows
Das Erste original programming